James Allanson Picton (8 August 1832 – 4 February 1910) was a British independent minister, author, philosopher and Liberal politician. Picton promoted a philosophy known as Christian pantheism.

Life
Picton was born at Liverpool, the eldest son of Sir James Allanson Picton and his wife Sarah Pooley. His father was an architect and supporter of the Liverpool Free Library. He was educated at the High School, and at the Mechanics' Institute and joined his father's architectural practice at the age of 16. Three years later he decided to study for the ministry and joined the Lancashire Independent College and Owens College, Manchester. He achieved a first in classics and in 1855 was awarded MA at the University of London.

In spite of allegations of heresy, in 1856, he was appointed to Cheetham Hill congregational church at Manchester. There he gave a course of popular lectures to the working classes, but one of his sermons revived the allegation of heresy and in 1862 he went to Gallowtree Gate chapel, Leicester. In 1869 he became pastor of St. Thomas's Square chapel, Hackney where he upset orthodox members by delivering lectures on secular themes such as English history and the principles of radical and conservative politics on Sunday afternoons to the working classes. He remained at Hackney until 1879. He wrote much in the press and published many sermons, pamphlets, and volumes on religion and politics.

Picton started to take an active part in public life as an uncompromising radical. He represented Hackney on the London School Board from 1870 to 1879 and was  chairman of the school management committee for three years. In 1883 he was chosen as a radical candidate for  Tower Hamlets but in June 1884 he stood instead at a by-election for Leicester. He was elected Member of Parliament to succeed Peter Alfred Taylor, most of whose opinions he shared. He retained the seat in the following elections and resigned from the House of Commons in 1894. He was very small in stature, but possessing good oratorical powers, and retaining the manner of the pulpit, he always won the ear of the House of Commons, where he was known as a sincere advocate of extreme views.

After his retirement, Picton built Caerlyr Hall at Penmaenmawr, North Wales in about 1896 (the name Caerlyr means City of Leicester in Welsh).  William Ewart Gladstone was said to have been a friend of Picton and visited the area frequently. Picton died at Caerlyr Hall aged 77.

Picton married firstly Margaret Beauont, daughter of John Beaumont of Manchester; and secondly Jessie Carr Williams, daughter of Sydney Williams a publisher. He had four sons.

Pantheism

Picton was a disciple of Spinoza and authored Pantheism: Its Story and Significance, in 1905. Picton was a proponent of Christian pantheism which was termed "the religion of the universe". In his book The Mystery of Matter, Picton considered the universe as a manifestation of an infinite energy with the God of Christianity as substantially identical.

Publications
From 1879 to 1884 he wrote leaders in the Weekly Dispatch, then an advanced radical organ, and contributed to the Christian World, The Theological Review, the Contemporary Review, Macmillan's Magazine, the Examiner, and other periodicals.

His books included :
 A Catechism of the Gospels, 1866.
 New Theories and the Old Faith, 1870
 The Mystery of Matter, 1873
 The Religion of Jesus, 1876
 Pulpit Discourses, 1879
 Oliver Cromwell: the Man and his Mission, 1882
 Lessons from the English Commonwealth, 1884
 The Conflict of Oligarchy and Democracy, 1885 James Allanson Picton The Conflict of Oligarchy and Democracy
 Sir James A. Picton: a Biography, 1891
 The Bible in School, 1901
 The Religion of the Universe, 1904
 Pantheism: Its Story and Significance, 1905
 Spinoza: A Handbook to the Ethics, 1907
 Man and the Bible, 1909

References

Jincheng Shi. (2018). "Pantheism and Science in Victorian Britain". University of Leeds.

External links 
 
 
 

1832 births
1910 deaths
19th-century British philosophers
20th-century British philosophers
Alumni of the University of London
Liberal Party (UK) MPs for English constituencies
Members of the London School Board
Pantheists
UK MPs 1880–1885
UK MPs 1885–1886
UK MPs 1886–1892
UK MPs 1892–1895